John Bryan Morgan (born March 31, 1956) is an American attorney. He is best known as founder of personal injury law firm Morgan & Morgan.

Biography
Morgan was born on March 31, 1956, in Lexington, Kentucky, the eldest of five children, to Ramon Morgan and Patricia Morgan. When Morgan was fourteen years old, his family moved to Winter Park, Florida. Morgan began working in various jobs at an early age, as his family struggled financially. In 1974, he entered the University of Florida, where he earned a bachelor's degree in arts in 1978. He took an 18-month hiatus selling ads to pay for his studies at the University of Florida Levin College of Law. He received his Juris Doctor in 1982. While at university, he was the elected president of the Florida Blue Key society. Morgan met his wife, Ultima Degnan, while studying law. They were married in May 1982. Morgan and Ultima Ann Degnan have four children.

Career

Early legal career
After graduating from law school in 1982, Morgan began his legal career at the law firm of Billings, Morgan (no relation) and Cunningham in Orlando. He left in 1985 to co-found the law firm Griffin, Morgan & Linder, a partnership that lasted three more years. According to Florida Trend, the partners differed in their views on marketing, in particular, Morgan insisted on advertising on television, which at the time was a controversial practice for lawyers.

Morgan & Morgan

From 1988 to 2005, Morgan was a founding partner at Morgan, Colling & Gilbert. In 1989, the law firm began aggressive advertising on television and radio to the discontent of the legal community. The company also practiced enticing top young lawyers from other law firms. By early 2000s, the firm expanded throughout Florida with 420 employees, and by 2013 the company had 260 attorneys among 1,800 staffers in Florida, Georgia, Mississippi, Kentucky, and Manhattan.

In 2005, Morgan bought out his partners' share of the company and renamed the firm Morgan & Morgan, also adding his wife Ultima as partner. Three of his children, Matt, Mike, and Dan, eventually joined the law firm.

The firm bills itself as "America's Largest Injury Law Firm." Morgan & Morgan is headquartered in Orlando. As of 2022, the law firm had over 3,000 employees, including 800 lawyers in 49 states. In 2018, the firm received over two million phone calls and signed up 500 new cases each day. That year, the firm collected $1.5 billion in settlements and spent $130 million nationwide on advertising. Morgan was one of the first lawyers to advertise in phone books and television commercials.

In 2021, Morgan's law firm fired half of its marketing department. The staffing purge came in the wake of a controversial Morgan & Morgan national advertising campaign, "Size Matters," which was meant to convey the large scale of the firm, but was criticized as an inappropriate dick joke. The staffers who were fired had criticized the ad campaign's phallic implications. The firm said that no one was fired because of the controversy surrounding the campaign.

Morgan & Morgan has been involved in a number of notable legal cases, including the Daytona Beach Rollercoaster Incident, the Tampa Walgreens Sexual Harassment case, a $ 22million case against Healogics Inc., and a class action lawsuit against Exactis data broker over a data breach, among others. The law firm has been also successful in a major lawsuit against R.J. Reynolds Tobacco Company in 2018.

In August 2022, Morgan starred in his firm commercial using the metaverse.

Politics
Morgan is a prominent donor to the Democratic Party. He served as former President Bill Clinton's state finance chairman.

He stated in November 2016 that he was considering running for Governor of Florida in the 2018 election. On November 24, 2017, he announced on Twitter that he was disillusioned with the current state of American politics and was leaving the Democratic Party to register as an independent. He also criticized the Democratic National Committee for supporting Hillary Clinton before the Democratic primary was over in 2016.

Morgan has been an advisor and fundraiser for Bill Clinton, Barack Obama, Hillary Clinton, and Nancy Pelosi.

Morgan donated to Hillary Clinton's 2016 presidential campaign. Morgan gave $355,000 to the Biden Victory Fund in August 2020. Morgan is close to Joe Biden's younger brother, Frank Biden. Morgan flew Frank Biden to Joe Biden's inauguration in his private jet. Morgan said he talked to Frank Biden about job opportunities at Morgan & Morgan.

Medical marijuana legalization
Motivated by his younger brother Tim Morgan's paralysis and struggle with cancer, Morgan has been involved in efforts to legalize medical marijuana in Florida since 2013. Medical marijuana appeared as 2016 Florida Amendment 2 on the November 2016 ballot. Morgan contributed to the "yes" efforts by donating $6.5 million along with television and radio advertisements personally supporting the measure.

Morgan organized United for Care campaign and was involved in changing Amendment 2's language. Medical use of cannabis in Florida was legalized in 2016 by way of a constitutional amendment. Appearing on the ballot as Amendment 2, the initiative was approved with 71% of the vote. Morgan and Jimmy Buffett are partners in a medical marijuana company called "Coral Reefer."

2020 Florida Amendment 2
Morgan & Morgan contributed $1.5 million toward a proposed Florida constitutional amendment to raise the hourly minimum wage to $15. In particular, he pledged to spend $1 million to raise Florida's minimum wage to $15. Morgan & Morgan was a major donor to the political committee Florida for a Fair Wage, donating the bulk of the $4.15 million raised by the campaign. In October 2019, Morgan announced that he had acquired enough signatures to get the minimum wage amendment on the ballot in November 2020. The amendment passed on November 3, 2020, via a statewide referendum concurrent with other elections. The amendment sets to increase the state's hourly minimum wage to $15 by 2026.

Orlando Weekly reported that some employees at Morgan & Morgan made less than $15 per hour. When questioned by Orlando Weekly, Morgan said "I can tell what angle you're getting at with this story, and it's bullshit," saying that many of his call center employees start out with a $25,000 annual salary (an hourly wage of $15 an hour is equal to roughly $31,200 a year). Morgan said the turnover rate for employees at his call center is very high in the first six months, but those who stick it out make an average of $35,000 a year.

Philanthropy and other ventures
He is a real estate investor who has purchased land, hotels, restaurants, and shopping centers. Morgan's estimated net worth ranges from $500 million to $730 million. Morgan and his wife Ultima Ann Degnan were among major donors and fundraisers behind Boys Town Orlando opening and Annunciation Catholic Academy in Altamonte Springs. In 2013, Morgan and his wife donated $2 million to the Second Harvest Food Bank of Central Florida. In 2015, the Morgans pledged $1 million toward a $7.4 million Harbor House domestic abuse shelter. Among other donations are $1 million to the UF law school; and $1 million to the homeless aid nonprofit Community Resource Network; $2 million to help build the Second Harvest Food Bank's central warehouse; and $1 million toward a new Harbor House domestic violence shelter.

Morgan is the founder of WonderWorks Attraction, PMP Marketing Group, ClassAction.com, and Abogados.com. He is also a partner in the legal software company Litify.

Publications
You Can't Teach Hungry: Creating the Multimillion Dollar Law Firm, E.O. Painter Printing Company (2011)

References

External links

1956 births
Living people
People from Lexington, Kentucky
People from Orlando, Florida
20th-century American lawyers
21st-century American lawyers
American cannabis activists
Florida lawyers
Trial lawyers
Florida Democrats
Florida Independents
Fredric G. Levin College of Law alumni